Diana Box Alonso (born 6 March 1971) is a Spanish team handball player who played for the club CBF Elda and on the Spanish national team. She was born in Haute-Savoie, France. She competed at the 2004 Summer Olympics in Athens, where the Spanish team reached the quarter finals.

References

1971 births
Living people
Sportspeople from Haute-Savoie
Spanish female handball players
Olympic handball players of Spain
Handball players at the 2004 Summer Olympics